Cold Prey 2: Resurrection is a 2008 Norwegian slasher film, directed by Mats Stenberg. It is the sequel to the highly successful Cold Prey (Fritt Vilt), and premiered in Norway on 10 October 2008. Written by Roar Uthaug and again starring Ingrid Bolsø Berdal in the leading role, this film picks up where the first left off. The female protagonist is picked up in the wilderness and brought to a hospital, but soon her nightmare starts all over again. Reviewers, though not overwhelmed, declared it a surprisingly good sequel to the original. Its opening weekend was the best for any Norwegian movie in history.

Plot
Jannicke (Berdal), the only survivor from the massacre depicted in the previous movie, is found in Jotunheimen and brought to a hospital in Otta. She receives good care, but she is still traumatized from her ordeal. At the hospital she speaks with the police and informs them of the location of the bodies, including that of the killer mountain man. Jannicke also speaks with and befriends a young boy, Daniel, who is a patient as well.

The police discover several bodies in the crevice Jannicke described; one of them is the body of the mountain man, apparently dead. The police transport all the bodies back to the hospital for autopsies. Kindly doctor Camilla informs Jannicke of this, and Jannicke attacks the mountain man's apparently dead body before being restrained.

While a nurse is cataloging the mountain man's clothes, he begins to stir. The staff frantically work to revive the man; when Jannicke hears this she is desperate to stop them, but the staff sedate her despite Camilla's objection. The doctors revive the mountain man, who appears to be in a coma. However, some time later he awakens and murders the policeman who was guarding him.

Meanwhile, the police chief has been researching old files of disappearances, and he discovers that the mountain man has been killing people on the mountain for decades. The man was a disturbed, violent child whose parents owned the mountain hotel. The police return to the crevice and find many more, older bodies.

At the hospital, the mountain man commences a killing spree across the hospital, while Jannicke awakens, finds Daniel and Camilla, and eventually locks the mountain man in the basement. By the time the trio reaches the exit, the police have arrived. Daniel is taken safely away by his mother.

The officers order Jannicke and Camilla to remain outside while they go in to apprehend the (apparently trapped) mountain man. Heedless of Jannicke's warnings, the officers enter the hospital and discover that the mountain man has knocked the basement door down. As they move to leave the hospital, the mountain man springs a trap and kills all of them but Ole, Camilla's boyfriend, who is gravely wounded.

Seeing the flash of gunshots within the hospital, Jannicke demands to enter the hospital with the remaining officer, but before they can act, the mountain man attacks, wounding her and killing the officer. As the mountain man prepares to kill Camilla, he is shot and apparently killed by the dying Ole.

Jannicke comforts Camilla but turns to discover that the mountain man's body has disappeared into the woods, presumably headed towards his lair in the abandoned hotel. The determined Jannicke resolves to return to the hotel to kill him, despite Camilla's warning. Jannicke travels by snowmobile to the hotel, but she falls asleep as she waits for the mountain man's return. When she awakens, he is standing behind her.

After a brief and fierce struggle, the mountain man prepares to kill Jannicke, but he is suddenly shot in the back by the newly arrived Camilla. He grabs Camilla by the head and begins to crush her, but Jannicke spears him through the heart with his own pickaxe. Although Camilla assures her that he is dead, Jannicke  retrieves her shotgun and fires it point blank into the mountain man's head.

Cast
Ingrid Bolsø Berdal as Jannicke
Marthe Snorresdotter Rovik as Camilla
Kim Wifladt as Ole
Fridtjov Såheim as Herman
Johanna Mørck as Audhild
Mats Eldøen as Sverre
Robert Follin as The Mountain Man

Production
The first of the two Cold Prey-movies was extremely well received, and seen by 260,000 – a high number for Norway. One reviewer even described it as "the best slasher flick" of 2006. For this reason the expectations on the sequel were high, and Ingrid Bolsø Berdal (whose character was the only surviving member of the original cast) emphasised the determination of everyone involved to make good film, not simply cash in on a mediocre sequel. Though she enjoyed the role, Berdal insisted that this would be the last installment.

Norsk Filmfond gave financial support to the project 4 February 2008, and the new cast was announced 20 February. Mats Stenberg took over as director after Roar Uthaug, who had directed the first movie. Filming started in late February.

The shooting was eventful, with Berdal at one point suffering from food poisoning; having to perform scenes in between throwing up. There were also lighter moments, with team members hiding in various rooms of the hotel where they were staying, doing their best to scare the others by jumping out wearing masks. While the outdoor scenes were filmed in the wild scenery of Jotunheimen and the village Otta, the scenes in the hospital were shot in Åslund hospital in Ås.

Reception
Norwegian reviewers were remarkably unanimous in their assessment of the film. All of the three major national newspapers gave it four out of six points. The consensus was that, even though the sequel did not quite live up to the original, it was still enjoyable and not disappointing. Morten Ståle Nilsen, writing for Verdens Gang, commented on the beautiful natural setting, and commended Berdal for managing to look both battered and sexy at the same time. Dagbladets Vegard Larsen declared himself surprised that the sequel turned out as well as it did. Like Nilsen, he compared Berdal to Ellen Ripley, Sigourney Weaver's character in the Alien-films. Per Haddal in Aftenposten concluded that the film failed to scare its audience as much as it intended, but he nevertheless complimented the solid handiwork.

The movie was seen by 101,564 people on its opening weekend, which was a new Norwegian record for a domestic movie. The previous record – of 70,952 – was set by Mors Elling in 2003. The box-office success was largely the result of a massive marketing campaign in the weeks leading up to the movie's release.

Anton Bitel of the Vodzilla.co gave the film 6 out of 10. He praised its outside and inside scenery but said that it was lacking originality.

Home media
Cold Prey 2 was released on DVD on 23 April 2013.

Prequel

The prequel, called Cold Prey 3, was filmed in 2010, directed by Mikkel Brænne Sandemose.

References

External links
 
 
 
 Fritt Vilt II at the Norwegian Film Institute (English)

2008 films
2008 horror films
2000s slasher films
2000s Norwegian-language films
Norwegian slasher films
Norwegian horror films
Films shot in Norway
Films set in Norway
Norwegian sequel films